Ion Bogdan (6 March 1915 – 10 July 1992) was a Romanian international footballer and coach, he played for Unirea Tricolor București, CFR București, Red Star Paris, MTK Budapest, and AS Bari in the Serie A. He earned 12 caps for Romania national team scoring three goals, and participated at the 1938 FIFA World Cup in a match against Cuba.

Honours

Player
Rapid București
Cupa României (6): 1936–37, 1937–38, 1938–39, 1939–40, 1940–41, 1941–42

Coach
Al-Shabiba Mazraa
Lebanese League: 1966–67

Racing Beirut
Lebanese League: 1969–70

Individual
 Total matches played in Romanian First League: 150 matches – 78 goals
 Top scorer of Romanian First League: 1940–41
 European Cups (Mitropa Cup): 9 matches – 3 goals
 Romania B: 2 matches – 2 goals

External links

1915 births
1992 deaths
Footballers from Bucharest
Romanian footballers
Romania international footballers
Romanian football managers
Romanian expatriate football managers
Unirea Tricolor București players
FC Rapid București players
Red Star F.C. players
MTK Budapest FC players
S.S.C. Bari players
Serie A players
1938 FIFA World Cup players
Liga I players
Nemzeti Bajnokság I players
Romanian expatriate footballers
Expatriate footballers in France
Romanian expatriate sportspeople in France
Expatriate footballers in Italy
Romanian expatriate sportspeople in Italy
Expatriate footballers in Hungary
Romanian expatriate sportspeople in Hungary
Expatriate football managers in Lebanon
Romanian expatriate sportspeople in Lebanon
Association football forwards
Racing Club Beirut managers
Al Shabiba Mazraa Beirut managers